Erman Refik Toroğlu (born 24 November 1948) is a Turkish former association football player, FIFA-level referee and, current pundit and sports columnist.

Career
Toroğlu earned his FIFA badge in 1989. The last arbitrated professional football game by Toroğlu was between Samsunspor and Fenerbahçe at Samsun 19 Mayıs Stadium in 1993–94 1.Lig season, ended 2–0, on 5 December 1993.

Toroğlu started punditry, joining Turkish sportscaster Şansal Büyüka, in the weekly football review show "Maraton", aired at Show TV, in 1996. The program lasted 8 years until 2004, when the show was moved to Lig TV of Digiturk satellite television provider. Toroğlu quit Maraton in 2010. He had a short punditry spell at TRT in 2015.

Personal life
He married Şükran Toroğlu in 1974. They have two sons. They divorced in 2017. In 2022, he married lawyer Ezgi Yavuz, who is 34 years his junior.

Honours
Ankaragücü
Turkish Cup (1): 1971–72
Ministry of Youth and Sports Cup (1): 1977

References

External links
 
 Erman Toroğlu referee profile at Turkish Football Federation

1948 births
Turkish footballers
Association football defenders
MKE Ankaragücü footballers
Living people